The 1972 Virginia Slims of Washington  was a women's tennis tournament played on indoor carpet courts at the Linden Hill Racquet Club in Bethesda, Maryland in the United States that was part of the 1972 Women's Tennis Circuit. It was the inaugural edition of the tournament and was held from February 24 through February 29, 1972. Unseeded Nancy Gunter won the singles title and earned $3,500 first-prize money.

Finals

Singles

 Nancy Gunter defeated  Chris Evert 7–6(5–1), 6–2

Doubles
 Wendy Overton /  Valerie Ziegenfuss defeated  Judy Tegart /  Françoise Dürr 7–5, 6–2

Prize money

References

Virginia Slims of Washington
Virginia Slims of Washington
1972 in sports in Washington, D.C.
Virginia Slims of Washington